Fuck Pussy Galore (& All Her Friends) is a compilation album by Washington, D.C. Indie band Unrest, released on February 21, 1992 by TeenBeat Records.

Track listing

Personnel
Adapted from the Fuck Pussy Galore (& All Her Friends) liner notes.

Unrest
 Phil Krauth – drums, bass guitar, vibraphone, percussion, backing vocals (6–22)
 Tim Moran – electric guitar, acoustic guitar, bass guitar, percussion, backing vocals (1–3, 6–22)
 David Park – instruments (23–25)
 Mark Robinson – lead vocals, electric guitar, bass guitar, drums, percussion, keyboards, production
 Chris Thomson – bass guitar, guitar, percussion and backing vocals (6–22)

Production and additional personnel
 Richard Ashman – engineering (6–21), production (1–3)
 Wharton Tiers – production (23-25), engineering (23-25)
 Terry Tolkin – engineering (22)
 Butch Vig – production (22)

Release history

References

External links 
 

1992 compilation albums
Unrest (band) albums
Albums produced by Mark Robinson (musician)
Albums produced by Wharton Tiers
Albums produced by Butch Vig
TeenBeat Records albums